Gleichen was a provincial electoral district in Alberta, Canada, mandated to return a single member to the Legislative Assembly of Alberta from 1905 to 1963.

History
Gleichen was one of the original 25 electoral districts contested in the 1905 Alberta general election upon Alberta joining Confederation in September 1905. The electoral district was merged with Drumheller prior to the 1963 Alberta general election to form the short lived Drumheller-Gleichen electoral district.

The district was named after the town of Gleichen, Alberta, that is situated north of Siksika Nation.

Members of the Legislative Assembly (MLAs)

Election results

1905 general election

1906 by-election

1909 general election

1910 by-election

1911 by-election

1913 general election

1917 general election

1921 general election

1926 general election

1930 general election

1935 general election

1940 general election

1944 general election

1948 general election

1952 general election

1955 general election

1959 general election

Plebiscite results

1948 Electrification Plebiscite
District results from the first province wide plebiscite on electricity regulation.

1957 liquor plebiscite

On October 30, 1957 a stand-alone plebiscite was held province wide in all 50 of the then current provincial electoral districts in Alberta. The government decided to consult Alberta voters to decide on liquor sales and mixed drinking after a divisive debate in the Legislature. The plebiscite was intended to deal with the growing demand for reforming antiquated liquor control laws.

The plebiscite was conducted in two parts. Question A asked in all districts, asked the voters if the sale of liquor should be expanded in Alberta, while Question B asked in a handful of districts within the corporate limits of Calgary and Edmonton asked if men and woman were allowed to drink together in establishments. Question B was slightly modified depending on which city the voters were in.

Province wide Question A of the plebiscite passed in 33 of the 50 districts while Question B passed in all five districts. Gleichen voted overwhelmingly in favor of the plebiscite. The district recorded about average voter turnout, being a couple points above the province wide 46% average.

Gleichen also voted on question B1 with just 19 residents lying inside the electoral district within the corporate limits of Calgary. Only 5 residents showed up to vote, they unanimously voted to allow mixed drinking.

Official district returns were released to the public on December 31, 1957. The Social Credit government in power at the time did not considered the results binding. However the results of the vote led the government to repeal all existing liquor legislation and introduce an entirely new Liquor Act.

Municipal districts lying inside electoral districts that voted against the Plebiscite were designated Local Option Zones by the Alberta Liquor Control Board and considered effective dry zones, business owners that wanted a license had to petition for a binding municipal plebiscite in order to be granted a license.

By-Election reasons
December 7, 1906—Appointment of Mr. Charles Stuart to the Judicial Bench.
October 3, 1910—Resignation Ezra Riley in protest against leadership of his party.
October 31, 1911—Death of Mr. Archibald J. McArthur.

See also
List of Alberta provincial electoral districts
Gleichen, Alberta, a hamlet within Wheatland County, Alberta

References

Further reading

External links
Elections Alberta
The Legislative Assembly of Alberta

Former provincial electoral districts of Alberta